Lesotho Sign Language is a sign language used by the Deaf community in Lesotho. It is a variety of South African Sign Language.

References

Sign languages
Languages of Lesotho